Grail (styled GRAIL) is an American biotechnology company, which began in 2015 as a start-up in  San Francisco, California, seeking to develop an early cancer screening test for people who do not have symptoms. Its headquarters is in Menlo Park, California, with locations in Washington, D.C., North Carolina, and the UK. Its parent company is Illumina in San Diego, California.

Their liquid biopsy, which was launched in June 2021 and is called the 'Galleri test', detects fragments of DNA in a blood sample via next-generation sequencing, which identifies DNA methylation, distinct patterns of which are associated with particular cancers, potentially allowing for the early detection of cancer and providing information of the origin of the cancer. It is one of three multicancer screening tests under investigation; the other two being the CancerSEEK assay and the PanSeer assay. On 27 November 2020, Grail announced a commercial partnership with the National Health Service (England) (NHS), to trial the Galleri test, reporting in 2026.

Origin
Grail began as a San Francisco biotechnology and pharmaceutical startup company in 2015, the parent company being Illumina of San Diego, which produces most of the DNA sequencing machines that scientists use to study human biology and diagnose rare genetic diseases. Grail's chairman is Jay Flatley. According to Forbes in 2017, 20% of Grail's profits are kept by Illumina.

In September 2020, Illumina announced an agreement to purchase Grail outright for $7.1 billion. In March 2021, the Federal Trade Commission sued to block the vertical merger. In September 2022, an administrative judge ruled against the FTC's position on antitrust grounds.

Activities
Illumina's own research showed that repeatedly sequencing DNA in the bloodstream made it possible to detect floating bits of DNA from cancer cells more accurately. It initially aimed to recruit greater than 100,000 people into its clinical trials in order to accumulate the sizeable data required to detect and interpret cancer biomarkers.

Galleri test
Grail calls its liquid biopsy for early cancer the 'Galleri test' or the 'Galleri multicancer early detection (MCED) test', one of three multicancer screening tests under investigation and being validated as of November 2020; the other two being the CancerSEEK assay and the PanSeer assay. The Galleri test detects fragments of DNA in a blood sample via next-generation sequencing, which identifies DNA methylation, distinct patterns of which are associated with particular cancers, potentially allowing early detection of cancer and providing information of the origin of the cancer.

Grail's first clinical trial for the Galleri test is the 'Circulating Cell-free Genome Atlas Study'. The study looked at more than 50 distinctive cancer types in blood and tumour tissue samples from 15,254 people from 142 locations in North America, including people with new cancer and blood samples from people without a cancer diagnosis. Subsequently the Galleri test entered into a further three trials; STRIVE, SUMMIT, and PATHFINDER studies.

In November 2020 Grail announced a commercial partnership with the National Health Service (England) (NHS), to trial the 'Galleri test'; several scientists responded to the news.

The NHS England interventional randomised controlled trial includes two groups of participants; a group of 140,000 people aged 50 to 79 identified through NHS records who have no symptoms, who will have a yearly blood test over three years, and a second group of 25,000 people with possible cancer symptoms. The trial started on 31 August 2021, with primary completion date estimated at 15 July 2024 and study completion on 28 February 2026.

 at least seventeen clinical trials were in progress to investigate the performance and clinical utility of multicancer early detection tests, six of them involving Grail.

Investors
Investors in the company have included:

ARCH Venture Partners
Jeff Bezos
Bill Gates 
Johnson & Johnson
Bristol Myers Squibb
Merck
McKesson Ventures
Varian Medical Systems
Tencent
Amazon
Celgene Corporation

References 

Pharmaceutical companies of the United States
2021 mergers and acquisitions
American corporate subsidiaries